Abrostola brevipennis is a moth of the family Noctuidae. It is found from Kenya to South Africa.

Subpspecies 
There are two recognised subspecies:
Abrostola brevipennis brevipennis 
Abrostola brevipennis nairobiensis (Nairobi)

References 

Plusiinae
Owlet moths of Africa
Moths described in 1958